The following are the national records in athletics in Peru maintained by its national athletics federation: Federación Deportiva Peruana de Atletismo (FDPA).

Outdoor

Key to tables:

+ = en route to a longer distance

h = hand timing

A = affected by altitude

OT = oversized track (> 200m in circumference)

Men

Women

Indoor

Men

Women

Notes

References
General
Peruvian Outdoor Records – Men 31 October 2021 updated
Peruvian Outdoor Records – Women 30 November 2021 updated
World Athletics Statistic Handbook 2018: National Indoor Records
Specific

External links
 FDPA web site

Peru
Records
Athletics
Athletics